The Cibuco River is a river of Vega Baja, Puerto Rico. Part of the river goes through Vega Alta and Corozal municipalities. It is 23.75 miles long. Cibuco River meets Indio River. The river flooded up to 15 feet during Hurricane Maria in some neighborhoods and as late as 2019, the river floods when rains are heavy.

See also
 List of rivers of Puerto Rico

References

External links
 USGS Hydrologic Unit Map – Caribbean Region (1974)
 Ríos de Puerto Rico 

Rivers of Puerto Rico